The men's doubles tournament of the 2013 BWF World Championships (World Badminton Championships) was held from August 5 to 11. Cai Yun and Fu Haifeng were the defending champions.

Indonesians Mohammad Ahsan and Hendra Setiawan defeated Danes Mathias Boe and Carsten Mogensen 21–13, 23–21 in the final.

Seeds

  Ko Sung-hyun / Lee Yong-dae (third round)
  Koo Kien Keat / Tan Boon Heong (quarter-finals)
  Mathias Boe / Carsten Mogensen (final)
  Hiroyuki Endo / Kenichi Hayakawa (quarter-finals)
  Kim Ki-jung / Kim Sa-rang (semifinals)
  Mohammad Ahsan / Hendra Setiawan (champion)
  Liu Xiaolong / Qiu Zihan (third round)
  Cai Yun / Fu Haifeng (semifinals)

  Chai Biao / Zhang Nan (third round)
  Angga Pratama / Rian Agung Saputro (quarter-finals)
  Hoon Thien How / Tan Wee Kiong (third round)
  Shin Baek-cheol / Yoo Yeon-seong (third round)
  Lee Sheng-mu / Tsai Chia-hsin (quarter-finals)
  Vladimir Ivanov / Ivan Sozonov (second round)
  Alvent Yulianto Chandra / Markis Kido (third round)
  Maneepong Jongjit / Nipitphon Puangpuapech (withdrew)

Draw

Finals

Section 1

Section 2

Section 3

Section 4

References
tournamentsoftware.com

2013 BWF World Championships